Mayo South or South Mayo may refer to one of two parliamentary constituencies in County Mayo, Ireland:

Mayo South (Dáil constituency) (1923–1969)
South Mayo (UK Parliament constituency) (1885–1922)

See also
County Mayo